Hugh Bird is a British Formula One engineer. He is currently the race engineer for Sergio Pérez at the Red Bull Racing Formula One team.

Career
After graduating from Cambridge University, Bird started his career in motorsport in 2012 as a simulation and analysis engineer for Red Bull Racing. He then became a simulation performance engineer from 2015 to 2017. For the 2018 Formula One World Championship he was appointed as Max Verstappen's performance engineer in a spell where the Dutchman scored seven victories and several podium finishes. He was appointed as Sergio Perez's senior race engineer for the 2021 Formula One World Championship, coaching the Mexican to one victory and fourth place in the Drivers' Championship.

References

Living people
Formula One engineers
British motorsport people
Red Bull Racing
Year of birth missing (living people)